Arun Rai (born 1963) is an Indian born American scientist. Arun Rai is a permanent Regent's Professor at the Robinson College of Business at Georgia State University and holds J. Mack Robinson Chair of IT-Enabled Process Innovation and Supply Chains and the Harkins Chair of Information Systems. He served as an Editor-in-chief of Management Information Systems Quarterly (MISQ) for five years between 2016 and 2020. He has previously served as Senior Editor for Information Systems Research, MIS Quarterly, and Journal of Strategic Information Systems and as Associate Editor for several journals (e.g., Journal of Management Information Systems, Management Science, Decision Sciences, IEEE Transactions on Engineering Management, Information Systems Research, MIS Quarterly and Journal of the Association for Information Systems).

Education and Employment 
Arun Rai earned his integrated master's degree in science and technology from BITS Pilani in 1985, MBA from Clarion University of Pennsylvania in 1987, and PhD in Management Information Systems from Kent State University in 1990. He served as an assistant and later as an associate professor at Southern Illinois University at Carbondale from 1990 until 1997 before moving to Georgia State University in 1997. He has chaired 30 doctoral dissertations as of 2019.

Awards and Recognitions 
In recognition of his significant global contributions to the scientific research in the field of Information Systems, Rai was recognized as the Fellow of Association of Information Systems (FAIS) in 2010.

Rai was awarded with the Information Systems Society (ISS) Distinguished Fellow in 2014.

Arun Rai was the recipient of the prestigious LEO award (awarded in 2019 in Munich), which is named for the world's first business application of computing (The Lyons Electronic Office), and recognizes truly outstanding individuals in the field of Information Systems.

References

External links 
 http://robinson.gsu.edu/profile/arun-rai/
 http://arunrai.us/

American people of Indian descent
Kent State University alumni
1963 births
Living people
Georgia State University faculty
Information systems researchers
Management Information Systems Quarterly editors